Roco Kingdom 3 (Chinese: 洛克王国3：圣龙的守护) is a 2014 Chinese animated fantasy adventure film directed by Gong Bingsi and part of the Roco Kingdom film series. It was released on 10 July 2014. It was preceded by Roco Kingdom: The Desire of Dragon (2013) and it was followed by Roco Kingdom 4 (2015).

Cast
Yang Ying
Yan Mengmeng
Huang Zhenji
Xin Shan  
Tang Xiaoxi

Reception

Box office
The film earned  at the Chinese box office.

References

2010s fantasy adventure films
Chinese fantasy adventure films
2014 animated films
Animated adventure films
Chinese animated fantasy films
2014 films
Animated films based on video games